Weissia bizotii is a species of moss in the Pottiaceae family.

Distribution 
Weissia bizotii is found in Tanzania.

References 

Pottiaceae